Doris was a Circé-class coastal submarine of the French Navy, in service from 1928 until May 1940, when she was sunk off the Dutch coast by the German coastal submarine . The wreck was rediscovered by Dutch divers in 2003.

Service
Doris was already obsolete by the beginning of the Second World War. The Circé-class was designed shortly after the First World War, around 1923. That was the year the shipyard at Toulon begun construction on Doris and her three sister ships. She was launched in 1927 and commissioned in 1928.

By the beginning of the Second World War the boat was part of the 10th French submarine flotilla, which was moved to English port of Harwich in April 1940 to reinforce the British Royal Navy. Doris, under captain Jean Favreul, crossed the English Channel on 14 April. During that time Doris suffered damage to the engine of the main gas compressor, responsible for producing the air to ascend after a dive. The machine could not be repaired in Harwich, nor could the work be done in France as there was no spare part; the original compressors had been designed and produced in Germany.

Despite being significantly crippled and unable to dive, Doris was ordered on 6 May 1940 to prepare for a sortie on patrol in the North Sea, north of the Frisian Islands, off the Dutch coast, guarding the east entrance to the English Channel, in anticipation of a possible German invasion of England. The captain and the crew openly admitted in their letters to their families that they were not expecting to come back. On 8 May the five British and seven French submarines, including Doris, departed to carry out their patrol. The entire crew of Doris, and three Royal Navy personnel, were lost.

Rediscovery
Dutch divers Hans van Leeuwen and Ton van der Sluijs discovered the wreck of Doris in 2003.

References

Further reading
 Robert C. Stern, The hunter hunted: submarine versus submarine : encounters from World War I to the present, Naval Institute Press, 2007, Google Print, p.72-73 (translation of Lüth log and discussion of Doris sinking)
 Paul E. Fontenoy, Submarines: An Illustrated History of Their Impact, ABC-CLIO, 2007, Google Print, p.184 (details of Circé class and end fates of all four submarines of that class)

External links
 Doris specs at uboat.net
 Images

Circé-class submarines (1925)
Ships built in France
1927 ships
World War II submarines of France
Ships sunk by German submarines in World War II
World War II shipwrecks in the North Sea
Maritime incidents in May 1940
Submarines sunk by submarines